Gianluigi Rigoni (born 19 September 1956 in Cogollo del Cengio) is an Italian retired footballer. He played as a defender or midfielder. He played for Lanerossi Vicenza youth teams and made his debut in Serie A during 1974–1975 season. He then played for Padova in Serie C. Nowadays he managed Summaria, an amateur team based in Veneto. He is the father of Luca Rigoni and Nicola Rigoni.

References

Living people
1956 births
Italian footballers
Association football defenders
Calcio Padova players
L.R. Vicenza players